Teele is a surname. Notable people with the surname include:

 Arthur Teele (1946–2005), American lawyer and politician 
 Jack Teele (1930–2017), American football executive and sportswriter
 Stanley F. Teele (1906–1967), American academic administrator

See also
 Peele
 Teege
 Teel